Carla Maliandi is an Argentine writer and theatre director.

Career 
Maliandi's first novel The German Room was published to widespread acclaim and has been translated into English, French and German. She is also active on the Buenos Aires theatre scene, where she has written and/or directed a number of plays.

References

Argentine writers
Living people
1976 births